Asiye Khanum Ezzeddin Qajar (19th-century) was the mother of shah Fath-Ali Shah Qajar of Persia (r. 1797–1834).

She functioned as the administrator of the Qajar harem and the treasurer of her son, the Shah. When she died, her son married her trusted slave servant Khazen Al Doulah, to succeed his mother as harem administrator and treasurer.

References

 

19th-century births
19th-century deaths
19th-century Iranian women
Qajar royal consorts